

See also 2013 in birding and ornithology, main events of 2014 and 2015 in birding and ornithology
The year 2014 in birding and ornithology.

Worldwide

New species
See also Bird species new to science described in the 2000s

 São Paulo marsh antwren (Formicivora paludicola) (the last issue of RBO 21, from "Dec 2013", was released only in March 2014)
 Wakatobi flowerpecker (Dicaeum kuehni)
 Cryptic treehunter (Cichlocolaptes mazarbarnetti)
 Bahian mouse-colored tapaculo (Scytalopus gonzagai)
 Sulawesi streaked flycatcher (Muscicapa sodhii)

Taxonomic developments

Ornithologists

Deaths

World listing

Europe

Britain

Breeding birds

Migrant and wintering birds

Rare birds

Other events

North America
 An estimated 365 million to 968 million birds are killed every year in collisions with buildings; 140,000 to 328,000 are killed by wind turbines and thousands by civilian aircraft.

References

2014
Bird
Birding and ornithology by year